Skopos (before 1926: Σέτινα - Setina; Bulgarian/Macedonian: Сетина, Setina) is a village in Florina regional unit, Greece.

History
There were fortified palaces of Bulgarian Tsar  Samuel at the beginning of the 11th century, near the place where today's village is. In the autumn of 1017 the fortress was captured and burned down by the Byzantine Emperor Basil II. Soon afterwards, the Battle of Setina took place. In it the Bulgarian Tsar Ivan Vladislav opposed the Byzantines, but he was defeated.

In 1845 the Russian slavist Victor Grigorovich recorded "Tsrevo" as a mainly Bulgarian village. In the book Ethnographie des Vilayets d'Adrianople, de Monastir et de Salonique, published in Constantinople in 1878, that reflects the statistics of the male population in 1873, "Setigne" was noted as a village with 50 households and 140 male  Bulgarian inhabitants.

Demography
In 1905, Setina's population consisted of 816 Bulgarian Exarchists.

Skopos had 137 inhabitants in 1981. In fieldwork done by Riki Van Boeschoten in late 1993, Skopos was populated by Slavophones. The Macedonian language was spoken by people over 60, mainly in private.

References

Populated places in Florina (regional unit)